Unacknowledged rape is defined as a sexual experience that meets the legal definition of rape, but is not labeled as rape by the victim. Instead, the victim may label the experience as "bad sex", a "miscommunication", or a regrettable hook-up. This response is more frequently recognized among victims of acquaintance rape, date rape or marital rape.

Historic roots 
The definition of rape has varied across time and cultures, often representing the social undercurrents of society. As women gained equal rights and the separation of church and state increased, what constituted rape slowly changed.

Under the patriarchal doctrine of coverture, women were "legally considered the chattel of her husband, his possession." Relegating women to the position of object or property was ingrained in most cultures. During colonial times, sexual activity was still regulated by the church. As a result, rape was considered a crime against the man who "owned" the victimized woman, as opposed to the woman herself. Up until the 20th Century, women were viewed as morally impure if they had any non-marital sex, whether consensual or not .

The 1970s brought about the women's liberation movement, characterized by female bodily autonomy, reproductive rights, and sexual expression. A strong belief in feminism defined the movement. Due to this, the conceptualization of rape changed. Feminist writers suggested that rape was simply a tool used by men to keep control over women. They argued that rape did not just occur by strangers, but also involved acquaintances, partners, friends, and potentially even family members. They also began to challenge the notion that rape was solely the fault of the victim. Despite this social evolution, many victims still fail to acknowledge their experience as an assault.

Prevalence 
According to a 2015 study of 77 women, 60.4% of those that experienced experience sexual victimization did not acknowledge it as rape. Different situations warrant different likelihoods of acknowledged rape. A victim is much more likely to acknowledge a rape if the perpetrator was a stranger or somebody with whom they have a platonic relationship. The rate of acknowledgement is lower if the perpetrator is somebody that the victim was once or currently romantically involved with. Statistics demonstrate that a lack of vaginal penetration also decrease likelihood of acknowledgement. Only 13% of non-vaginal assaults are acknowledged. Intoxication also decreases the probability of acknowledgement. College-aged women raped by a schoolmate are the demographic in which unacknowledged rape is the most prevalent. Overall, a victim is more likely to acknowledge the rape if it was a vaginal assault including physical force committed by somebody with no romantic connections and the victim was sober at the time. A victim is the least likely to acknowledge the rape if it was a non-vaginal act committed in the context of a date rape and the victim was intoxicated.

Explanations

Sexual scripts and rape scripts 
Research suggests that women have a difficult time acknowledging date or partner rape due to previously learned sexual or rape scripts. Sexual scripts are mental layouts of how one is supposed to act in a sexual situation. These scripts are held in the cultural level, interpersonal level, and intrapersonal level. The script that sex is male-initiated and dominated and that men use methods of persuasion to get a woman to participate in sexual activities is a common script. This script is often used by victims to invalidate their own experiences and write them off as "bad sex" or a "miscommunication". Rape scripts also narrow down one's idea of what sexual assault is, prompting one to not acknowledge what happened to them. Many people still hold the belief that a rape is a violent vaginal penetration committed by a stranger in which physical force or threats are enacted. If one's experience does not fall into this narrow category, they might once again label it as a "miscommunication" or "bad sex" rather than rape. The word "rape" is a very loaded word. Many people are hesitant about using it to describe their experience unless it fits the rape script.

Previous sexual abuse 
Some research suggests that there is correlation between unacknowledged rape and childhood sexual abuse. Childhood sexual abuse is linked to many long-term issues in many areas of life. Some believe that sexual scripts begin to develop during adverse childhood experiences. CSA is often linked to guilt, sexual permissiveness, and the self-perception of being promiscuous. Although there are no conclusive case studies, this is a factor that can be taken into account.

Rape myths 
Rape myths are generalized or false beliefs held about rape, rapists, or rape victims that breed conditions unwelcome to rape victims. Such myths include "some women are asking for it" to "women only claim they are raped as an act of retaliation or to cover something up". Many of these risks are widely held by society and taught to young women whether directly or indirectly. Many of these myths put the burden of responsibility onto a woman if there is alcohol involved or there was a prior sexual relationship with the perpetrator. None of these myths hold the perpetrator accountable for his actions. Due to the fear of public reaction, or believing these myths themselves, a victim may be hesitant to label their situation as rape. Most of these myths are rooted in three forms of discourse. The first is the male sex drive discourse. This belief states that men have a biological need for sex that is difficult, if not impossible to control. They are not entirely responsible if they do not control this need, and it is a woman's duty to make sure this drive is satisfied. The second is the have-hold discourse. This implies that women have no sex drive and simply satisfy men for security or social standing. The third form of discourse is the permissiveness discourse, which claims that women enjoy sex as much as men and go after it freely with no impulse control. These three fallacies prompt society and often the woman herself to question the credibility of her use of the word "no".

Counterfactual thinking 
Counterfactual thinking occurs when an individual mentally morphs, restructures, or changes events. It is possible that unacknowledged rape victims use counterfactual thinking to cognitively reorganize the experience into something other than rape. Victims that exhibit counterfactual thinking typically reorganize their thought patterns by thinking of ways the situation could have been worse. Others think about ways they could have prevented the situation from occurring instead of thinking about the experience itself. Both of these thought patterns are clearly related to a lack of acknowledgment.

Relationship to perpetrator
Individuals who are raped by strangers are more likely to acknowledge their status as a rape victim. Conversely, individuals who are raped by acquaintances, friends, or significant others are more likely to be unacknowledged rape victims. Approximately 2/3 of assaults are committed by someone who knows the victim and 38% of assaults are committed by a friend of the victim. Acquaintance rape is highly prevalent and represents the majority of sexual assault cases. Therefore, a majority of victims are at an increased likelihood of being unacknowledged.

Drug and alcohol use 
If an individual was willingly under the influence of alcohol or drugs, they are less likely to acknowledge the event as a rape. This changes if the individual was unwillingly under the influence of drugs during the event- more popularly known as date rape. One study found that less than 10% of women who were intoxicated acknowledged their experience as rape. Another study found that over 50% of unacknowledged victims report being under the influence of alcohol or drugs at the time of the event while only approximately 25% of acknowledged victims report being impaired by a substance.

Legal and other issues 
Unacknowledged rapes can skew the validity of statistics regarding criminal behavior. Reputable reports such as the FBI violent crime report rely upon crimes reported to law enforcement to construct their statistics. The most recent study estimated that 135,755 women were raped in the year of 2017. However, the crime must be reported to be included in this report. Only 230 out of every 1,000 rapes are reported to law enforcement officials. If a victim does not acknowledge the assault, they do not acknowledge that a crime has been committed against them. If there is no crime, there is nothing to report to the police. For this reason, it is understood that such reports underestimate the prevalence of sex crimes. Studies regarding unacknowledged rape also call into question whether or not the current line of communication between victim and law enforcement officer yields the most success. When investigating reported assaults, the protocol is for the officer to ask, "Were you raped?" However, it has been found that people reporting rapes respond better to behaviorally descriptive questions such as "Did the perp (insert action) without your consent?". Unfortunately, not acknowledging a rape makes it much harder to prosecute. If a rape eventually becomes acknowledged and a report is made, the report is considered delayed. A delayed report makes conducting an examination for a rape kit impossible. Because jurors can also hold rape myths, a delayed report is often viewed in a negative light.

After effects 
There is inconclusive evidence regarding the effects of a rape that remains unacknowledged. Women who do not acknowledge their assaults often face similar issues to women who do acknowledge their assaults. Unacknowledged rape victims face a higher likelihood of re-victimization, especially in the case of a date rape where the victim holds a continued relationship with the assailant. Lower risk detection capacities and higher alcohol consumption are associated with unaddressed rapes. It has been found that the more time that passes, the more likely a victim is to acknowledge their rape. The prevalence of PTSD is where evidence is rendered inconclusive. Some studies report lower PTSD levels in comparison to victims who have acknowledged their rape, while others report the same or higher levels.

See also

Gray rape

References

Further reading 
 RAINN- Rape Abuse & Incest National Network 
 NIU Rape Myth Busting 
 Brownmiller, S. (1975). Against our will: Men, women and rape.
 Griffin, S. (1971). Rape: The all-American crime.
 Millet, K. (1970). Sexual politics.

Laws regarding rape